El juego de las llaves is a Mexican comedy streaming television series created by Marisa Quiroga and co-produced by Amazon Prime Video, Pantaya, and Corazón Films. The first season consist of 10 episodes and the series debuted on 16 August 2019 on Amazon Prime Video. The series stars Maite Perroni, Humberto Busto, Marimar Vega, Sebastián Zurita, Horacio Pancheri, Fabiola Campomanes, Hugo Catalán, and Ela Velden. The series revolves around the lives of four lasting couples who are friends and who decide to be swingers among themselves, also addresses issues such as monogamy in long relationships, self-realization and desire. On January 29, 2021, the series was renewed for a second and third season.

Cast

Main 
 Maite Perroni as Adriana "Adri" Romero
 Sebastián Zurita as Sergio Morales (season 1)
 Marimar Vega as Gabriela "Gaby" Albarrán
 Humberto Busto as Óscar Romero
 Horacio Pancheri as Valentín Lombardo.
 Hugo Catalán as Leonardo "Leo" Cuevas
 Ela Velden as Siena
 Fabiola Campomanes as Bárbara Cuevas
 Cristián de la Fuente as Guillermo (season 2)
 Alejandra Guzmán as Astrid (season 2)
 Laura León as Gloria (season 2)

Recurring 
 Mónica Maldonado as Mica romero
 Helena Haro as Carmen
 Manuel Vega as Daniel
 Alejandra Toussaint as Aurelia
 Anahí Allué as Amelia
 Mariel Molino as Gala
 Sergio Perezcuadra as Emiliano
 Luca Valentini as Fidel
 Mauro González as policeman

Episodes

Series overview

Season 1 (2019)

Season 2 (2021)

Awards and nominations

References

External links 
 
El Juego de las Llaves on Pantaya

Spanish-language Amazon Prime Video original programming
Amazon Prime Video original programming
2019 Mexican television series debuts
Spanish-language television shows
2010s Mexican comedy television series
2020s Mexican comedy television series